An appellation in general is a name, title, designation, or the act of naming. Specifically it may refer to:

 Appellation
 a verbal or written designation of an individual, e.g. Lord, or Prince
 a verbal or written designation of a unique object, e.g. Mount Everest
 a verbal or written designation of a unique concept, e.g. Nobel Prize
 a geographical-based term used to identify where the grapes for a wine were grown (Appellation) - see also Appellation d'origine contrôlée below
 Appellation of origin, a geographical indication, a name or sign used on products which corresponds to a specific geographical location or place of origin
 Appellation d'origine contrôlée (AOC), a certification for French agricultural products, which is the origin of the word as used in other languages 

In jurisprudence:

 For appeal or appellate, see Court of Appeals

Distinguish from

Appalachian (disambiguation) (US placenames)